The Brilliant Branch, also known as the Brilliant Cutoff, is a railway line in Pittsburgh and Aspinwall, Pennsylvania. It connects the Pittsburgh Line to the Conemaugh Line and to Allegheny Valley Railroad's Allegheny Subdivision.

History
The line was built in 1903–04 by the Pennsylvania Railroad (PRR) as a cutoff to avoid the busy Union Station and its yards. After the collapse of the Penn Central Transportation Company (the PRR's successor company) in 1976, the Brilliant Branch was abandoned.

In 1995, the Brilliant Branch (aside from the southernmost wye section) was leased and/or purchased by the fledgling Allegheny Valley Railroad (AVRR). The segment south of the Brilliant Branch Railroad Bridge was used as AVRR's main link from the Pittsburgh Line to its Allegheny Subdivision along the south shore of the Allegheny River. The Brilliant Branch Bridge was subsequently repaired and was used by AVRR to access the AZCON scrap yard on the north side of the river. In 2003, a segment of the P&W Subdivision was leased by AVRR and became their main link between the Pittsburgh Line and the Allegheny Subdivision, leaving the Brilliant Branch to be used for local traffic only.

In 2015, the AZCON scrap yard, the last remaining customer on the line, closed.

In 2016, the line was used as a detour from AVRR's usual route over the P&W Subdivision between the Allegheny Subdivision and the Pittsburgh Line while a trestle on that route was repaired. The line was to be used as a detour again during another phase of the trestle repair in 2019.

Current status
There is no regular traffic on the line as of 2019, aside for at the wye on the south end of the line which is used to turn around Amtraks's daily Pennsylvanian trains.

There are proposals to turn the Brilliant Branch into a rail-with-trail or rail-to-trail.

See also
 Brilliant Cutoff Viaduct
 Brilliant Branch Railroad Bridge

References

External links

 
 PENNSYLVANIA RAILROAD, BRILLIANT CUT OFF, SOUTH WYE

Pennsylvania Railroad lines
Pennsylvania Railroad Through-freight Lines
Railroad cutoffs